Gordon Drewe Henley (1940 – 14 February 2016) was an English actor. He had a variety of roles in film, television and theatre including as Red X-Wing Squadron Leader Garven Dreis in Star Wars Episode IV: A New Hope. He retired from acting due to bipolar disorder. His second wife was actress Felicity Kendal, with whom he had a son, Charley Henley.

Career
Henley appeared in film, television and theatre productions. These included episodes of Z-Cars, UFO, The Avengers and Randall and Hopkirk (Deceased) and a three-week run of Henry V in 1968 in which he played the lead role.

He is known for his role as X-Wing pilot Red Leader (Garven Dreis) in the film Star Wars Episode IV: A New Hope (1977), a role for which he was mistakenly credited as Drewe Hemley. Henley used an American accent for the part; the role had limited physical movement as Henley's character remained in the cockpit for much of the film which Henley found difficult. Unlike many of the actors in the first released film in the series, Henley's performance was not dubbed in post-production. Henley interpreted his character as an experienced battle veteran and so opted to play him without any excitement in his voice. Director George Lucas disagreed with this so they compromised so that Red Leader would at first be formal but as the battle progressed become more excited.

The performance was Henley's final one on film, as he was diagnosed with bipolar disorder, then known as manic depression, shortly after completing his part and retired from acting. When the Special Edition cut of Star Wars Episode IV: A New Hope was released in 1997 it featured an additional scene of Henley in which he talked with Luke Skywalker (Mark Hamill) and Biggs Darklighter (Garrick Hagon). Henley was pleased with the scene's addition, although his credit was not corrected.

Personal life
He was married to actress Jacqueline Pearce for three and a half years from 1963 until they divorced. He married actress Felicity Kendal in 1968 and they had one son, Charley, a special effects technician. They divorced in 1979 after he became manic depressive.

According to an interview with Kendal in 2000, Henley had become a "former" manic depressive. Henley and his illness were discussed in her autobiography White Cargo. He and his third wife, Lyn Henley, ran a bed and breakfast in Devon, and they were married until her death in 2015.

Death
In 2013, Henley was diagnosed with vascular dementia and within the last 12 months of his life had become increasingly frail and his dementia was advancing. On Valentine's Day, 2016, he choked to death on a fish pie at the Royal Devon and Exeter Hospital. He was 75 years old.

Henley posthumously reprised his role as Garven Dreis from Star Wars Episode IV: A New Hope in the 2016 film Rogue One: A Star Wars Story via the use of archive footage. Previously unused audio was also used for some of his scenes.

Filmography

Film

Television

References

External links

Obituary
In Memoriam

1940s births
2016 deaths
English male television actors
English male stage actors
English male film actors
Male actors from Worcestershire
People from Malvern, Worcestershire
People with bipolar disorder
People with vascular dementia
Deaths from choking
Date of birth missing
Place of birth missing